Bondi Beach is a beach located in the suburb of the same name in Sydney, New South Wales.

Bondi Beach may also refer to:

 Bondi Beach (horse) (foaled 2012), an Irish Thoroughbred racehorse
 Bondi Beach (Whiteley), a 1992 painting by Brett Whiteley

See also
 Bondi (disambiguation)